

This is a list of the National Register of Historic Places listings in Cross County, Arkansas.

This is intended to be a complete list of the properties and districts on the National Register of Historic Places in Cross County, Arkansas, United States. The locations of National Register properties and districts for which the latitude and longitude coordinates are included below, may be seen in a map.

There are 19 properties and districts listed on the National Register in the county, including 1 National Historic Landmark.  There are two formerly listed properties.

Current listings

|}

Former listing

|}

See also

List of National Historic Landmarks in Arkansas
National Register of Historic Places listings in Arkansas

References

 
Cross County